The Women's 4 × 100 metre freestyle relay competition of the 2016 FINA World Swimming Championships (25 m) was held on 6 December 2016.

Records
Prior to the competition, the existing world and championship records were as follows.

Heats
The heats were held at 13:26.

Final
The final was held at 20:12.

References

Women's 4 x 100 metre freestyle relay